Marcus Steinweg (born 1971, in Koblenz) is a German philosopher based in Berlin. His speciality is working between the fields of art and philosophy. He is an editor of the journal Inaesthetics.

Biography
Steinweg has worked on collaborations with artists such as Thomas Hirschhorn and Rosemarie Trockel. In 2011 he curated the exhibition “Kunst und Philosophie” (Art and Philosophy) at the Neue Berliner Kunstverein. He has given numerous talks, published many texts and participated in art exhibitions.

Book publications
Bataille Maschine, Berlin: Merve Verlag 2003
Subjektsingularitäten, Berlin: Merve Verlag 2004
Behauptungsphilosophie, Berlin: Merve Verlag 2006
Duras (with Rosemarie Trockel), Berlin: Merve Verlag 2008
Politik des Subjekts, Zürich-Berlin: Diaphanes Verlag 2009
Aporien der Liebe, Berlin: Merve Verlag 2010
Kunst und Philosophie / Art and Philosophy, Cologne: Verlag der Buchhandlung Walther König 2012
The Terror of Evidence: MIT Press 2017 (Evidenzterror: Matthes & Seitz Berlin 2015)
Inconsistencies: MIT Press 2017 (Inkonsistenzen: Matthes & Seitz Berlin 2015)
Fetzen - Für eine Philosophie der Entschleierung (with Marie Rotkopf), Matthes & Seitz, Berlin, 2022

Projects with Thomas Hirschhorn 
 Nietzsche Map (2003)
 Hannah Arendt Map (2003)
 Foucault-Map (2004)
 The Map of Friendship between Art and Philosophy (2007)
 Spinoza Map (2007)
 The Map of Headlessness (2011)

References

External links
  Steinweg, Marcus
  Inaesthetics

Living people
Philosophers of art
21st-century German philosophers
Critical theorists
Poststructuralists
1971 births
German male writers